Holmes Island is an island in the U.S. state of Washington.

Holmes Island was named after Albin Holmes, a railroadman who settled there.

References

Geography of Thurston County, Washington
Islands of Washington (state)